"Tomorrow" is a song by English band Strawbs credited as a band composition with the main idea by Dave Cousins. The track first appeared on the Grave New World album.

Lyrical and musical content

In the sleeve notes to the 1998 CD release of Grave New World, Dave Cousins revealed that the lyrics referred to his feelings of disappointment about Rick Wakeman and the way he had left the band, without a proper farewell. They are sung in a bitter almost vitriolic fashion.

The music is dominated by electric guitar and organ, Cousins recalls that it was the first time he had played electric guitar on an album and felt comfortable with it. The song ends after an instrumental break; this was reproduced and extended as part of the 1972 live act.

Personnel

Dave Cousins – lead vocals, electric guitar
Tony Hooper – acoustic guitar
Blue Weaver – Hammond organ, piano
John Ford – bass guitar
Richard Hudson – drums

External links
Lyrics to "Tomorrow" at Strawbsweb official site

References

Sleeve notes to album CD 540 934-2 Grave New World (A&M 1998 Remastered)
Grave New World 30th anniversary article on Strawbsweb

Strawbs songs
1972 songs
Songs written by Dave Cousins
Songs written by Richard Hudson (musician)
Songs written by Tony Hooper
Songs written by John Ford (musician)
Songs written by Blue Weaver